The 2017 PDC Pro Tour is a current series of non-televised darts tournaments organised by the Professional Darts Corporation (PDC). Players Championships, UK Open Qualifiers and European Tour events are the events that make up the Pro Tour. This year there are 40 PDC Pro Tour events being held – 22 Players Championships, six UK Open Qualifiers and 12 European Tour events.

Prize money 
Prize money for each European Tour event has increased from £115,000 to £135,000. The UK Open Qualifiers and Players Championship events stays the same as 2016.

This is how the prize money is divided:

PDC Tour Card
128 players are granted Tour Cards, which enables them to participate in all Players Championships, UK Open Qualifiers and European Tour events.

Tour cards

The 2017 Tour Cards were awarded to:
 (64) The top 64 players from the PDC Order of Merit after the 2017 World Championship. 
 (32) The 32 2016/17 Tour Card Holders not ranked in the top 64 of the PDC Order of Merit following the World Championship.
 (2) Two highest qualifiers from 2016 Challenge Tour ( and ).
 (2) Two highest qualifiers from 2016 Development Tour (  and ).
 (16) The 16 qualifiers from 2017 Q-School.
Afterwards, the playing field was complemented by the highest qualified players from the Q School Order of Merit until the maximum number of 128 Pro Tour Card players had been reached. In 2017, that means that a total of 12 players qualified this way.

Q-School
The PDC Pro Tour Qualifying School takes place at the Robin Park Tennis Centre in Wigan from January 19–22. The following players won two-year tour cards on each of the days played:

A Q School Order of Merit was also created by using the following points system:

To complete the field of 128 Tour Card Holders, places were allocated down the final Qualifying School Order of Merit. The following players picked up Tour Cards as a result:

UK Open Qualifiers
As with recent years, 6 qualifiers took place to determine seedings for the 2017 UK Open.

Players Championships
Compared to last year, there were two Players Championship events added on the calendar, increasing the number to 22. In addition, the top 64 of the Players Championship will qualify for the Players Championship Finals.

European Tour
Compared to last year, there are two European Tour events added on the calendar. In addition, the top 32 of the European Tour will qualify for the European Championship.

PDC Challenge Tour
The Challenge Tour consisted of 5 weekends of 4 events.

PDC Development Tour
The Development Tour consisted of 5 weekends of 4 events.

Professional Darts Corporation Nordic & Baltic
The Scandinavian Darts Corporation was renamed as the Professional Darts Corporation Nordic & Baltic (PDCNB). There were 10 events held over 5 weekends.

Dartplayers Australia Grand Prix Pro Tour
The Dartplayers Australia Grand Prix rankings are calculated from events across Australia. Gordon Mathers was the top player in the rankings, and therefore has automatically qualified for the 2018 World Championship.

EuroAsian Darts Corporation (EADC) Pro Tour
The 6 EADC Pro Tour events and the 2018 World Championship Qualifier were played at Omega Plaza Business Center, Moscow. Players from Armenia, Azerbaijan, Belarus, Georgia, Kazakhstan, Kyrgyzstan, Moldova, Russia, Tajikistan, Turkmenistan, Uzbekistan and Ukraine are eligible to play.

World Championship International Qualifiers

World Championship PDPA Qualifier
The winner qualified directly for the first round of the 2018 PDC World Darts Championship. The runner-up qualified for the preliminary round, as did the winner of the third-place playoff.

References 

 
PDC Pro Tour
2017 in darts